Animal Kwackers was a popular children's television series produced by Yorkshire Television and broadcast on Britain's ITV in the 1970s.

The Animal Kwackers were a four-piece pop band consisting of Rory, a lion; Twang, a monkey; Bongo, a dog; and Boots, a tiger. The characters were played by actors in costumes. The show was similar in many ways to the successful US series The Banana Splits and The Skatebirds.

The music was a mixture of well-known pop songs and original songs, most of which (including the theme song) were written by Roy Apps (of Heron) and the producer Peter Eden.

The jingle from the series was "Rory Rory tell us a story, Rory Rory tell it like it is!"

Cast for series 1 and 2
Nick Pallet and Geoff Nicholls from the band Principal Edwards played Twang and Bongo on series 1 of Animal Kwackers, with Tony Hannaford from G.T. Moore and the Reggae Guitars as Boots and Roy Apps as Rory. In 1980, Pallet, Nicholls and Tony Hannaford would be signed to the EMI label Cobra in the band Electrotunes (known for the single "If This Ain't Love"). In series 2, Peter Eden replaced Nicholls as Bongo.

 Rory, on guitar - Roy Apps
 Twang, on Bass - Nick Pallett 
 Bongo, on drums - Geoff Nicholls and (2nd series) Peter Eden
 Boots, on guitar - Tony Hannaford

Cast for series 3
 Rory, on guitar - Bev Doyle
 Twang, on bass - Step Morley
 Bongo, on drums - Atalanta Harmsworth
 Boots, on guitar - John Basset

Transmission guide

Series 1: 13 editions from 25 September 1975 – 18 December 1975
Series 2: 13 editions from 30 September 1976 – 23 December 1976
Series 3: 13 editions from 10 November 1977 – 2 February 1978

Recorded music

The Animal Kwackers released a double album which featured a selection of songs from the show. Whilst the album featured some original music (such as the main title theme and the "Rory, Rory..." interlude) it was mainly made up of cover versions, including The Beatles' "Yellow Submarine" and "Lucy In The Sky With Diamonds".

Label: Handkerchief
Catalog#: KYD 201
Format: 2 x Vinyl, LP
Country: UK
Released: 1975

DVD
All three series (minus two episodes missing from the archive) were released on DVD on 16 April 2012.

References

External links
 
 Animal Kwackers Nostalgia Central
 Animal Kwackers Little Gems

Television series by Yorkshire Television
1975 British television series debuts
1978 British television series endings
1970s British children's television series
ITV children's television shows
Fictional musical groups
British children's musical television series
British television shows featuring puppetry
Television series by ITV Studios
Television shows about dogs
Television series about lions
Television series about monkeys
Television series about tigers
English-language television shows